Margaret Ann Masters (24 October 1934 – 9 October 2022) was an Australian professional golfer. She won one title on the LPGA Tour in 1967, having been named Rookie of the Year two years earlier.

Early life
Masters was born in Swan Hill, Victoria, on 24 October 1934.  Her family later relocated to the Mornington Peninsula, where she started playing golf at the age of thirteen under her parent's influence. She attended Frankston High School outside Melbourne, where she set records in swimming. Masters won the inaugural Australian Girls' Amateur in 1953 and the Victorian Junior Championship four years in a row from 1951 to 1954. At senior level she won the New Zealand Women's Amateur in 1956, the South African Women's Amateur the following year, and the 1958 Australian Women's Amateur. She also won the Victorian Amateur five times between 1957 and 1963. After winning the Canadian Women's Amateur in 1964, she moved to the United States. In international competition she represented Australia in the Tasman Cup five successive times from 1954 to 1962 and played in the first two Commonwealth Trophy contests in 1959 and 1963.

Professional career
Masters turned professional in 1965, becoming the first Australian to join the LPGA Tour, and was conferred the tour's Rookie of the Year Award. She finished runner-up at the Women's Western Open the following year, a major championship. Masters won her first and only LPGA title in 1967 at the Quality Chek'd Classic. She also won the Yankee Ladies' Team Championship with Clifford Ann Creed that same year, and finished second at the Supertest Ladies Open, losing to Carol Mann by two strokes. She lost a playoff by a single stroke to Shirley Englehorn at the 1970 O'Sullivan Ladies Open, before losing again by one stroke to Judy Kimball at the same tournament the following year. Masters had another runner-up finish at the Colgate Far East Open in December 1974. She retired from the tour five years later.

While playing at a tournament in Florida, Masters escaped uninjured when a sniper fired several shots at her and Marilynn Smith, one of the founders of the LPGA. Although the incident left her agitated, she continued playing and ultimately made the cut. The perpetrator was never identified.

Outside of golf, Masters was noted for successfully applying for a green card under the category of individuals with "exceptional ability in sciences or arts who would substantially benefit prospectively the national economy, cultural interest or welfare of the United States". Her petition resulted in the decision in January 1969 – the Matter of Masters – that regarded her as an entertainer in the arts, paving the way for other professional athletes to settle in the US via the same route.

Later life
After retiring from competitive golf, Masters became a teacher.  She resided in Tucson, Arizona, during her later years.  Masters was inducted into Victoria's Golf Industry Hall of Fame in 2013.  She was also honoured in the halls of fame at Woodlands, the Ottawa Hunt and Golf Club, as well as the Ottawa Valley Golf Association.  The Woodlands championship trophy bears her name.

Masters died on 9 October 2022 in Tucson.  She was 87 years old.

Amateur wins
1951 Victorian Junior Championship
1952 Victorian Junior Championship
1953 Victorian Junior Championship, Australian Girls' Amateur
1954 Victorian Junior Championship
1956 New Zealand Women’s Amateur Stroke Play Championship, New Zealand Women's Amateur
1957 South African Women's Amateur, Victorian Women's Amateur Championship
1958 Australian Women's Amateur
1959 Victorian Women's Amateur Championship
1960 New Zealand Women’s Amateur Stroke Play Championship
1961 Victorian Women's Amateur Championship
1962 Victorian Women's Amateur Championship
1963 Victorian Women's Amateur Championship
1964 Canadian Women's Amateur

Professional wins

LPGA Tour wins (1)

LPGA Tour playoff record (0–1)

Other wins
 1967 Yankee Ladies' Team Championship (with Clifford Ann Creed)

Team appearances
Amateur
 Commonwealth Trophy (representing Australia): 1959, 1963
 Tasman Cup (representing Australia): 1954 (winners), 1956 (tied), 1958 (winners), 1960 (winners), 1962 (winners)

References

External links

Australian female golfers
LPGA Tour golfers
People from Swan Hill
Sportspeople from Tucson, Arizona
1934 births
2022 deaths
20th-century Australian women